The 1950 Nevada Wolf Pack football team was an American football team that represented the University of Nevada as an independent during the 1950 college football season. In its fourth season under head coach Joe Sheeketski, the Wolf Pack compiled a 1–9 record and were outscored by opponents by a total of 363 to 117. Sheeketski resigned as athletic director and head coach.

Schedule

References

Nevada
Nevada Wolf Pack football seasons
Nevada Wolf Pack football